S. Swathi was a 24-year-old Indian Infosys employee who was murdered on June 24, 2016, at the Nungambakkam railway station in Chennai, Tamil Nadu, India while on her way to her office. Swathi was murdered in front of several people, with passengers remaining mute spectators, an assailant, suspected to be Ramkumar's, escaped, and Swathi's body lay unattended before the police arrived and started their investigation process.

Victim
Swathi was the daughter of Santhana Gopalakrishnan, a retired employee of ESIC, the health insurance company of the Indian government. She completed a bachelor's degree in computer science at Dhanalakshmi College of Engineering in 2014, taking a course in Oracle in Anna University the same year. After being selected for a job at Infosys, she underwent training in Mysore and received a job as a System Engineer. Sidhu, a friend of Swathi from the engineering college, described her as a friendly woman who generally kept to herself.

Murder
At around 6:30 am IST on June 24, 2016, Swathi's father dropped her off at the Nungambakkam railway station in Chennai. As part of her daily routine, Swathi was waiting at the station to travel to her workplace in Mahindra World City. She was stabbed to death with a sickle following an argument with a man who had been waiting for her approximately 30 minutes beforehand. The attacker fled at around 6:42 am. Initially, the police who discovered her body covered it with shirts purchased from nearby stores, and her body was left in such a position for more than two hours. A senior officer later reached the station and delivered the body to the Government General Hospital.

Suspect
P. Ramkumar was born in Meenakshipuram, a small village in the Tirunelveli district of Tamil Nadu. His father, Paramasivam, was an employee of the telecommunications company BSNL, and his mother, Pushpam, was an agricultural worker. Ramkumar finished of schooling in 2011, and received a degree in mechanical engineering in 2015, though he found difficulty receiving employment. Ramkumar and Swathi were Facebook friends, and they had previously exchanged phone numbers, as per police records. A police officer stated that Ramkumar had stalked Swathi on Facebook, and monitored her movements offline. Seeking employment in the film industry and an opportunity to be closer to Swathi, he took residence in Choolaimedu, a locality of Chennai. Acquaintances characterized Ramkumar as largely solitary; some residents of Meenakshipuram said he was "friendless". On September 18, 2016, Ramkumar, allegedly committed suicide by electrocuting himself in his cell at the Puzhal central prison in Chennai. Police have claimed that the accused died after biting a live electric wire.

Investigation
The Madras High Court said it would intervene if the investigation proved lax, condemning the slowness of railway police in attending to the body. The case was quickly transferred from railway to city police after little progress was made. On July 1, 2016, Ramkumar was arrested for the murder in Tirunelveli. He allegedly attempted to commit suicide by slitting his throat, and was transferred to the government hospital of Tirunelveli  A friend of Swathi, Bilal Malik, has also been taken in for questioning by the police.

During the tenure of the investigation, Ramkumar allegedly committed suicide,  on 18 September 2016, while lodged in central prison. He was taken to hospital after he bit a live wire,  where he was declared dead.

Controversy
N. Panchapakesan, founder of Chennai Sai Sankara Matrimonials, authored a blog highlighting the Swathi murder case and made several remarks including calling men from other castes "loafers" who were attempting to bracket Brahmin goles for their "Higher Genetics" and being born a Brahmin is a rarity with inter-caste Marriages being a “Himalayan blunder.” The blog was subsequently removed after widespread social media outrage and criticism by the press.

In popular culture
In 2017, Ramesh Selvan directed a film Swathi Kolai Vazhakku based on the incident, but due to legal hurdles later, the film's title was changed to Nungambakkam and released in October 2020.

References

Indian murder victims
Criminal investigation
Violence against women in India
Stalking
June 2016 crimes in Asia
2016 murders in India
Crime in Tamil Nadu
Deaths by stabbing in India